Mount Southern is a small mountain, or nunatak, located 1.5 nautical miles (2.8 km) northeast of Mount Harry and 14 nautical miles (26 km) southeast of FitzGerald Bluffs, in Palmer Land. Discovered and photographed by Lincoln Ellsworth on November 23, 1935. Mapped by United States Geological Survey (USGS) from surveys and U.S. Navy air photos, 1961–66. Named by Advisory Committee on Antarctic Names (US-ACAN) for Merle E. Southern, USGS Topographic Engineer in Antarctica, 1967–68.

Mountains of Palmer Land